Mulino is a rural locality (a settlement) in Volodarsky District of Nizhny Novgorod Oblast, Russia. Population:   Dialing code: +7 83136. Postal code: 606083.

Military

There is a significant military presence in the area; a local newspaper describes Mulino as "surrounded by military units". An important facility in the area is the Mulino training center of the Russian Ground Forces, which in September and December 2007 was the site of joint US-Russian military exercises, part of the series codenamed "Torgau" (after the city in Germany that figures in the military history of both countries). Joint exercises at Mulino were originally planned for 2006 ("Torgau-2006"), but were canceled, possibly due to the protests of certain local groups against the presence of foreign military on Russian soil.

Among military units listed by Kommersant-Vlast in 2002 at Mulino were the 34th Guards Artillery Division, the 99th Guards Self-Propelled Artillery Regiment (3 MRD), the 211th Training Artillery Brigade, the 245th Guards Motor Rifle Regiment (3 MRD), the 752nd Motor Rifle Regiment, the 237th and 100th Tank Regiments (3rd Motor Rifle Division), one other unit, and a penal battalion. Headquarters 3rd Motor Rifle Division was nearby in Nizhny Novgorod.

There is also a penal battalion at the site.

Several military reorganizations have now occurred. As of late 2009, units there appear to include 6th Tank Brigade (2022 partially transformed into the 26th Tank Regiment of the reestablished 47th Guards Tank Division), 288th Artillery Brigade, and a rocket forces and artillery depot. 

In 2014 a new training range site will be opened in Mulino, in accordance with a €100-million-plus agreement signed with Germany’s Rheinmetall to build a brigade-sized live combat simulation and marksmanship training center. Due to the Ukraine crisis in 2014 and Russia's participation in the conflict in Ukraine and sanctions imposed by European Union against Russia, Rheinmetall cancelled this agreement with Russian Defence Forces.

The peak of the large-scale Zapad-2021 military exercises conducted by the Russian and Belarusian armies, was in Mulino.

See also
 :ru:Гороховецкий артиллерийский полигон - The Gorokhovets Artillery Research and Testing Range, located near the village of Mulino.

Notes

References

Sources
 

Rural localities in Nizhny Novgorod Oblast
Volodarsky District, Nizhny Novgorod Oblast